Musik, dans & party 3 is a 1987 studio album by Sten & Stanley.

Track listing
En vanlig dag (Wolverton Mountains) (M.Kilgore-M.Forsberg)
Vindens melodi (G.Lindberg-G.Lengstrand)
Den gamla goda tiden (U.Nordqvist-M.Forsberg)
Glad som en speleman (Lill-Magnus-M.Forsberg)
Vet att jag blev född att älska dig (Nothing's Gonna Change My Love for You) (M.Masser-G.Goffin-I.Forsman)
Änglar visst finns dom (Angelo Mio) (C.Bruhn-F.Thorsten-M.Forsberg)
It's Been a Long Time (J.Styne-S.Cahn)
I mitt fönster (U.Nordqvist-M.Forsberg)
Linnea (E.Taube)
The Great Pretender (B.Ram-K.Almgren)
Sköna söndag (T.Skogman)
Röd var din mun (Rot war dein Mund) (R.Dokin-A.Svensson-E.Nilsson)
Cocco Bello (Cocco Bello Africa) (D.farina-C.Minellono-O.Avogadro-L.Valter)
När jag behövde dig mest (Just When I Needed You Most) (R.vanWarmer-I.Forsman)

References 

1987 albums
Sten & Stanley albums